Île des Cygnes may refer to:
Île des Cygnes (former island) in Paris
another French name for Mauritius

See also
Cygne (disambiguation)
Swan Island (disambiguation)